Perpétue Nshimirimana (born February 1961) is a Burundian diplomat and writer.

Born in Bujumbura, Nshimirimana studied at the Lycée Clarté Notre Dame de Bujumbura before traveling to Algeria for university, where she received a diploma in journalism from the Institut National des Sciences de l'Information et de la Communication. She returned home in 1984 to work at the Radio Télévision Nationale du Burundi. She served as a member of the national council on communication and the national UNESCO commission. From 1991 to 1992 she was a member of the constitutional commission, and in 1993 she served on the national electoral commission.  After the election of Melchior Ndadaye as president, Nshimirimana was named Permanent Representative of Burundi to the United Nations in Geneva, a role which ended with the assassination of Ndadaye later in 1993.  As of 2015 she lived in Switzerland. In 2005 she received the "Femme exilée, Femme engage" prize for her work with Burundian orphans.

Nshimirimana's autobiography, Lettre à Isidore, was published in 2004.

References

1961 births
Living people
Burundian women writers
Women autobiographers
Permanent Representatives of Burundi to the United Nations
Burundian women in politics
Burundian women diplomats
People from Bujumbura
Burundian expatriates in Switzerland
21st-century women writers
Women ambassadors